Mirza Khujista Akhtar Jahan Shah (Persian: میرزا خجسته اختر جهان شاه) (4 October 1673 – 30 March 1712) was the fourth son of Emperor Bahadur Shah I.

Life
He was made Subahdar of Malwa (1707–1712) and raised to an Imperial Mansab of 30,000 Zat and 20,000 Sawar. After his father's death, he sided with his brother Mu'izz-ud-Din and defeated his other brother, Azim-ush-Shan in 1712. But Mu'izz-ud-Din disagreed with him over the distribution of the Imperial treasury and fought a battle against him in which he was killed along with his eldest son Farkhunda Akhtar.
His youngest son Muhammad Shah later ruled as emperor for 28 years.

Family
One of his wives was Zakiyat-un-nissa Begum, the daughter of Prince Muhammad Akbar. He had married her at Agra in 1695, at the same time his brother Rafi-ul-qadr married her  sister Raziyat-un-nissa Begum. Another was Fakhr-un-nissa Begum, the descendant of Sarih Qazi, and the mother of Emperor Muhammad Shah. She died on 16 May 1733, aged about sixty years. Another of his wives was Nek Munzir Begum, who died at Delhi, on 27 April 1744.

References
The Mughal Empire by John F. Richards

Notes

1673 births
1712 deaths
Mughal princes